is a Japanese politician of the Liberal Democratic Party and a member of the House of Representatives in the Diet (national legislature). Matsumoto served as a vice minister for the Cabinet Office between August 2017 and January 2018. He resigned from his post after recorded in the Diet mocking the gravity of US military helicopter accidents in Okinawa.

Overviews 
A native of Sera District, Hiroshima and graduate of Meiji University, he was elected to the House of Representatives for the first time in 1985. After losing his seat in 2003, he was re-elected in 2005.

His profile on the LDP website:
Former member of the Metropolitan Assembly
Member, Committee on Audit and Oversight of Administration
Member, Special Committee on Disasters
Director, Committee on Land, Infrastructure, Transport and Tourism

Positions

Matsumoto, who is affiliated to Nippon Kaigi, attended a party organized by the Tokyo branch of the openly revisionist lobby to celebrate the Shinzō Abe cabinet, where the Imperial Rising Sun Flag was flown, the "Kimigayo" sung, and the pledge to "break away from the post-war regime" renewed.

Matsumoto gave the following answers to the questionnaire submitted by Mainichi to parliamentarians in 2012:
in favor of the revision of the Constitution
in favor of right of collective self-defense (revision of Article 9)
in favor of reform of the National assembly (unicameral instead of bicameral)
in favor of the reactivation of nuclear plants
against the goal of zero nuclear power by 2030s
in favor of the relocation of Marine Corps Air Station Futenma (Okinawa)
in favor of evaluating the purchase of Senkaku Islands by the Government
in favor of a strong attitude versus China
against the reform of the Imperial Household that would allow women to retain their Imperial status even after marriage
against the participation of Japan to the Trans-Pacific Partnership
against a nuclear-armed Japan

References

Sources

External links
 Official website in Japanese.

1949 births
Living people
Politicians from Hiroshima Prefecture
Members of the Tokyo Metropolitan Assembly
Koizumi Children
Members of Nippon Kaigi
Members of the House of Representatives (Japan)
Liberal Democratic Party (Japan) politicians
Meiji University alumni